Dahlia merckii, Merck's dahlia, is a species of flowering plant in the daisy family Asteraceae, native to Mexico. This tuberous herbaceous perennial has divided leaves, and produces single flowers in shades of lilac, white and pink, in late summer and autumn.

Otherwise tubers must be lifted and stored over winter. They begin to sprout in spring, but must be protected until all danger of frost has passed. Propagation is by seed or cuttings in spring.

References

Flora of Mexico
merckii